Pimpama is an indigenous language of Australia, possibly spurious (Davies, 2022), and if real, certainly extinct. The language was spoken on the coast near modern-day Brisbane. Along with Gowar, it may have been related to the Bandjalangic languages (Jefferies 2011).

References

Sources
 Davies, S. (2022, 8 July - 10 July). Your language is dead: Go learn Bundjalung — Those who said Yugambeh [Conference presentation]. Australian Languages Workshop 2022, Dunwich, Qld, Australia.

Yugambeh–Bundjalung languages
Extinct languages of Queensland